N.O.C. The Jam (Room) Studio is a Music rehearsal space in Mumbai, India. The space's target audience is rock/metal/punk bands in Mumbai. N.O.C. stands for "No Objection Certificate (Issued)" as the studio was started in an industrial estate after taking out all the necessary licenses and no-objection certificates required for creating ultra-loud levels of noise in an otherwise peaceful environment. This is one of the reasons it has survived, and has become a hangout for emerging and established Mumbai rock bands. 

After N.O.C., similar jam rooms have begun to spring up in other cities in India.

External links
 Split Magazine's Article on N.O.C. The Jam Studio
 Time Out's Article on N.O.C.
 About N.O.C.
 N.O.C. Booking Calendar

Indian music industry